Lorenzo Carlo Domenico Milani Comparetti (27 May 1923 – 26 June 1967) was an Italian Catholic priest. He was an educator of poor children and an advocate of conscientious objection.

Biography
Milani was born in Florence in 1923 to a rich middle-class family. His father, Albano Milani, and his mother, Alice Weiss, were staunch secularists. Alice Weiss was Jewish and a cousin of Edoardo Weiss, one of Sigmund Freud's earliest disciples and the founder of the Italian Psychoanalytic Association. Milani's paternal great-grandfather was Domenico Comparetti, a leading nineteenth-century philologist. In his own work as an educationist, Milani emphasized learning how to use words effectively.

In June 1943, after a period of study at the Brera Academy, Milani converted from agnosticism to Catholicism, perhaps after a chance conversation with Don Raffaele Bensi, who later became his spiritual director. He also exchanged a complacency of the economically fortunate for solidarity with the poor and despised. He was ordained a priest in 1947 and sent to assist Don Daniele Pugi, the old parish priest of San Donato in Calenzano. There he established his first school of the people (scuola popolare), The fact that it served children from both believing and non-believing families scandalized conservative Catholic circles. After Pugi's death in 1954, Milani was sent to Barbiana, a small, remote village in the Mugello region.

At Barbiana, Milani continued his radical educational activities despite both clerical and lay opposition.

Writings

In the spring of 1958, he published his first book, Pastoral Experiences (Esperienze pastorali). In December, the Holy Office ordered its withdrawal from circulation as "inopportune". despite failing to find in it any errors of doctrine or breaches of ecclesiastical discipline. Milani made no public objection.

In his "Letter to Military Chaplains" ("Lettera ai cappellani militari"}, and a later letter to judges he advocated conscientious objection, the right to say "No". His writings on this subject are recognized as important contributions to anti-military education. In 1965, Milani was put on trial for these writings.

Working for a year with his pupils, Milani coordinated the production of Letter to a Teacher (Lettera a una professoressa), which denounced the inequalities of a class-based educational system that advantaged the children of the rich over those of the poor. It was composed by eight boys from the school of Barbiana, according to the "group writing" method inspired by the cooperative writing method promoted by Mario Lodi and influenced by Celesine Freinet. Lodi visited Barbiana and his students engaged in exchanges with those at Barbiana. It has been translated into about forty languages. It introduces many of the themes that became prominent in the later development of the Sociology of Education. The text served as a manifesto for the 68 movement, serving as an indictment of not only the Italian schooling system but Italian society at large.

Death and legacy

In 1967, shortly after the publication of Letter to a Teacher, Milani died in his mother's house in Florence of leukemia.

In 2008 Helena Dalli, an MP and member of the Malta Labour Party, summarized Milani's life and work: "Milani's ideas were considered dangerously radical and his bishop sent him into a sort of exile to a small mountain village north of Florence called Barbiana, thought too remote for him to cause problems. He started a full-time school there for children who had been failed or abandoned by the traditional education system. Eventually, hundreds of pupils of all ages were attracted to his teaching methods. Artists, farmers, scientists, artisans and professionals were invited to give hands-on explanations of their activities. Pupils were also made to read and evaluate national and international news. The aim was to educate them to analyze events critically so as to face life without fear and to solve problems with determination and awareness."

A documentary film from RAI describes Lorenzo Milani's educational project and its impact on Italian society. The film includes interviews with former students of the school at Barbiana and others. (The film is available with English text).

Pope Francis visited Barbiana on 20 June 2017 to visit and pray at Milani's tomb.

See also
 Streetwise priest

References

Sources
Batini, F, Mayo, P and Surian, A (2014), Lorenzo Milani, The School of Barbiana and the Struggle for Social Justice, New York, Vienna, Berne, Oxford, Frankfurt, Hamburg: Peter Lang.
Borg, C Cardona, M and Caruana, S (2013) Social Class, language and Power. 'Letter to a Teacher', Lorenzo Milani and the School of Barbiana. Rotterdam, Boston and Taipei: Sense.
Borg, C, Cardona, M and Caruana, S (2009), Letter to a Teacher.  Lorenzo Milani's Contribution to Education for Critical Citizenship, Malta: Agenda
Burtchaell, J.T. (Ed.) (1988), A Just War no Longer Exists. The Teaching and Trial of Don Lorenzo Milani, Indiana: University of Notre Dame Press.
Centro Formazione e Ricerca Don Lorenzo Milani e Scuola di Barbiana (2008) Socrate e Don Lorenzo(Socrates and Don Lorenzo), Vicchio (Florence): Centro Formazione e Ricerca Don Lorenzo Milani e Scuola di Barbiana.
Corzo, J.L (2011) „Alla Scuola della Parola. Analisi teologico-spirituale degli scritti di don Lorenzo Milani‟ (For the School of the Word. A theological-spiritual analysis of Lorenzo Milani‟s writings), in R. Sani and D. Simeone (Eds.), Don Lorenzo Milani e la Scuola della Parola. Analisi storica e prospettive pedagogiche (Don Lorenzo Milani and the School of the Word. Historical Analysis and Pedagogical Perspectives), Macerata: Edizioni Università di Macerata (EUM).
Fallaci, Neera  (1993), Vita del Prete Lorenzo Milani. Dalla parte dell’ultimo (Life of the Priest Lorenzo Milani. On the side of those who are last), Milan: Biblioteca Universale Rizzoli.
Gesualdi, M (Ed.)(2011), L’obbedienza nella Chiesa (Obedience in the Church), Florence: Liberia Editrice Fiorentina
Grech, M and Mayo, P ( 2014) "What Catholic educators can learn from the radical Christianity and critical pedagogy of Don Lorenzo Milani," International Studies in Catholic Education, Vol. 6 No.1, pp. 33–45.
Martinelli, E, (2007).Don Lorenzo Milani. Dal motivo occasionale al motive profondo (Don Lorenzo Milani. From the occasional motive to the profound motive),  Florence: Società Editrice Fiorentina
Mayo, P (2007) "Critical approaches to education in the work of Lorenzo Milani and Paulo Freire", Studies in Philosophy and Education, Vol. 26, No. 6, pp. 525–544. Reproduced in Mayo, P (2013) Echoes from Freire for a Critically Engaged Pedagogy, New York and London: Bloomsbury Academic.
Mayo, P (2013) "Lorenzo Milani in Our Times" Policy Futures in Education Vol. 11 No. 5, pp. 515–522.
Mayo, P (2015) "Italian signposts for a sociologically and critically engaged pedagogy. Don  Lorenzo Milani (1923-1967) and the schools of San Donato and Barbiana revisited," British Journal of Sociology of Education, Vol. 36, No. 6, pp. 853–870.
Simeone, D. (1996), Verso la Scuola di Barbiana. L’esperienza pastorale educativa di don Lorenzo Milani a S. Donato di Calenzano (Towards the School of Barbiana. The Pastoral Experience of Don Lorenzo Milani at San Donato di Calenzano), San Pietro in Cariano  (Verona): Il Segno dei Gabrielli Editori.
Starnone, Domenico (2007), "A Barbiana scoppiò il '68' " (The ‟68 movement started at Barbiana) in Gesualdi, M. (Ed.), Scuola di Barbiana. Lettera a una Professoressa. Quarant’anni dopo (School of Barbiana. Letter to a Teacher. 40 years later), Florence:Libreria Editrice Fiorentina

1923 births
1967 deaths
Converts to Roman Catholicism from atheism or agnosticism
Deaths from cancer in Tuscany
Deaths from leukemia
Italian educational theorists
Clergy from Florence
Brera Academy alumni
20th-century Italian Roman Catholic priests